The 1999–2000 Toto Cup Al was the 16th season of the third-most important football tournament in Israel since its introduction. This was the first edition to be played with both Israeli Premier League and Liga Leumit clubs.

The competition began on 6 August 1999 and ended on 15 February 2000, with Maccabi Petah Tikva beating Maccabi Haifa 4–1 in the final.

Format change
Starting with this edition, the competition was played as a knock-out tournament, with the first two rounds played over two legs, with ties from the quarter-finals and on were decided in a single match.

Results

First round

|}

Second round

|}

Quarter-finals

Semifinals

Final

See also
 1999–2000 Toto Cup Artzit

References

External links
 Israel Cups 1999/2000 RSSSF
 Toto Cup, Season 1999-2000 Israeli Football 

Al
Toto Cup Al
Toto Cup Al